SSRF may refer to:

 Server-side request forgery, a type of security exploit
 Shanghai Synchrotron Radiation Facility
 Small Scale Raiding Force, a British Commando unit during the Second World War